Mark David Lee (born May 29, 1973) is an American musician known as the guitarist and a founding member of the Christian rock band, Third Day. He and vocalist Mac Powell were the only original members present throughout the band's entire history.
 
Third Day has amassed album sales of over 6 million units. Lee has performed over 1200 shows with the band, traveling throughout the United States, Europe, Australia, Brazil and South Africa.  Most recently Third Day became the first Christian artist to embark on a USO tour, performing for American troops in Iraq and Kuwait.

As a songwriter, Lee has co-written over 20 number-one songs with Third Day.  He is the principal writer of "Sky Falls Down" and "Alien", both named GMA Rock Song of the Year;  and "Show Me Your Glory", the 2003 ASCAP Song of the Year.  Lee has written songs with or for numerous other artists, including Matthew West, Kim Hill, Bart Millard, and Steven Curtis Chapman. "Strong Tower", Lee's collaboration with Kutless, became a #1 hit and the title track of their album of the same name.

Lee published his debut memoir, Hurt Road: The Music, the Memories, and the Miles Between, on September 5, 2017 through Revell Books.

Lee is originally from Powder Springs, Georgia. He currently lives in Marietta, Georgia with his wife and daughters.

Discography

With Third Day

 Third Day (1996)
 Conspiracy No. 5 (1997)
 Time (1999)
 Offerings: A Worship Album (2000)
 Come Together (2001)
 Offerings II: All I Have To Give (2003)
 Wire (2004)
 Wherever You Are (2005)
 Revelation (2008)
 Move (2010)
 Miracle (2012)
 Lead Us Back: Songs of Worship (2015)
 Revival (2017)

Solo

 Unshakable Heart EP (2018)
 Your Love Will Find Me - Single (2019)
 How To Feel Alive - Single (2019) [To be released]

References

External links
Mark Lee's blog

Living people
1973 births
American performers of Christian music
Georgia Tech alumni